The Barbara Speake Stage School was opened on 10 February 1945 as an independent school, and was initially set up as a dancing school, by the founding principal Miss Barbara Speake, MBE, and was located in East Acton, London. The school was fee-paying but non-selective in its admissions.

The school closed in 2020.

History
In 1961, June Collins (mother of drummer/singer Phil Collins) joined forces with Barbara Speake to become the school's agent. Collins supplied the entertainment industry with children for every major production in the West End, TV and Theatre. Due to the success of both the agency and dancing school, in 1963 the decision was made to turn their successes in to a full-time educational establishment for the performing arts. Collins discovered Jack Wild playing football and decided that he was a child with potential, and persuaded his family to let him attend the full-time school. Wild went on to receive an Academy Award nomination for his portrayal of "The Artful Dodger" in Oliver! Collins died in November 2011.

Barbara Speake was appointed a Member of the Order of the British Empire (MBE) in the 2007 New Year Honours, for services to drama in London.

The School received an Inadequate Ofsted rating at its last inspection (30 April 2019). The decline from a Satisfactory rating began with an emergency inspection on 4 July 2014 which found that the welfare, health and safety of pupils was at risk following the installation of CCTV without appropriate changing facilities being provided. The inspection found that there were no changing facilities for female pupils.

Alumni

Over the years, Collins had an eye for talent, and with Speake, the school has helped to develop some notable performers in the entertainment industry, including:

 Aml Ameen (born 1985), actor
 Amma Asante, screenwriter, film director and former actress
 Rachel Brennock actress, singer and songwriter
 Naomi Campbell, model
 Keith Chegwin, child actor and TV presenter
 Julie Dawn Cole, actress
 Phil Collins, drummer, singer, solo artist, music producer, actor (and June Collins' son)
 Brian Conley, comedian, actor, singer and TV presenter 
 Alison Dowling, actress
 Michelle Gayle, actress and singer 
 Kim Goody, actress and singer
 Nick Grant, member of 1990s boy band Ultimate Kaos
 Denise Gyngell, singer, member of the 1980s pop group Tight Fit
 Grange Hill cast members Lindy Brill (Cathy), Paul McCarthy (Tommy), Mark Baxter (Duane), Mark Savage (Gripper), Gary Love (Jimmy), Ian Congdon-Lee (Ted), Darren Cudjoe (Clarke)
 Demi Holborn (born 1992), singer
 Keith Jayne, actor
 Kwame Kwei-Armah, actor and playwright
 Lindy Layton, lead vocalist of Beats International and 1989 number one single Dub Be Good to Me
 Angie Le Mar, comedian
 Sylvestra Le Touzel, actress
 Paul J. Medford, actor
 David Parfitt, film producer 
 Jeff Stevenson, comedian
 Sara Sugarman, writer, director, and actress
 Mark Summers, casting director
 Paul Varney of 1980s pop duo Yell!
 Noel Simpson and Rahsaan Bromfield of the 1990s pop group Damage
 Jack Wild, child actor 
 Kedar Williams-Stirling (born 1994), actor

References

External links
  - Official biography of Barbara Speake

1945 establishments in England
Educational institutions established in 1945
Acton, London
Drama schools in the United Kingdom
Defunct schools in the London Borough of Ealing
2020 disestablishments in England
Educational institutions disestablished in 2020